Wang Yan Cheng (王衍成, sometime wrote 王衍城) is a Chinese painter born January 9, 1960, in Guangdong province, living and working in France.

Biography
Wang Yan Cheng was born in Guangdong province, China in 1960. He graduated from the Shandong Institute of Fine Arts in Yantai in 1985; he then studied in the Chinese Central Institute of Fine Arts between 1986 and 1988; Wang Yan Chen then moved to France to complete his studies at the Saint-Etienne Plastic Arts University, from 1990 to 1992.

In 2021, he was awarded the Correspondence of the National Academy of Arts of Italy, the National Michelangelo Medal in 2020, the Italian Berry Art Prize in 2019, He has won the Commander Medal of French Arts and Literature in 2015, the Legion of Honour in 2013, at the meantime, he serves as president of Fonds De Dotation Des Beaux-Arts De Wyc, vice president of Salon Comparaisons, vice president of IACA International Art Center. Wang Yan Cheng is a member of AIAP UNESCO, he serves as a visiting professor of Accademia di Belle Arti di Roma and Shandong University of Arts, in addition, he is a master's supervisor while he is distinguished professor of UAA.

Since 1993, he has held more than 50 solo exhibitions, up to 100 joint exhibitions in the meanwhile. He works with major galleries such as Galerie Lelong & Co. (France), Galerie Louis Carré (France), Acquavella Galleries(USA).

The artist has decorated the Beijing Opera with a giant artwork in 2007. In 2006, he was named Chevalier des Arts et des Lettres by the French Government.

Recent Exhibitions
 2022   Galerie Lelong & Co.
2021   Collection Pinault Kering France
2021   Contemporary Art at Shandong Art Museum, China
2020   National Gallery of Modern Art, Italy
2020   National Art Museum Collection Exhibition, China
2020   Shenzhen He Xiangning Art Museum Collection Exhibition, China
2020   First International Biennale in Jinan, China
2019   Italian National Art Academy, Italy
2019   Acquavella Galleries, USA
2018   Academy of Fine Arts in Roma, Italy
2018   Today Art Museum, China
2018   Ueno Art Museum, Japan
2017   Taylor Foundation, France
2017    National Art Museum of China
2015    Asian Art Museum in Nice, France
2014   Taipei History Museum, Taiwan
2010   Montparnasse Museum, France
2000   He Xiangning Art Museum, China
2000   Guangdong Provincial Art Museum, China
2000   National Art Museum of China, China

Decorations 
 Commander of the Order of Arts and Letters (2015)

Collections 
 François Pinault Collection Foundation
National Museum of Modern Art in Italy
Groupe Dassault 
Montparnasse Art Museum
Nice Museum
Acquavella Galleries
Stephen Wynn Collection Foundation
National Art Museum of China
National Grand Theater of China
Diaoyutai State Guesthouse
People's Liberation Army Grand Theater
Hong Kong New World Group Foundation
Guangdong Art Museum
Shandong Art Museum
He Xiangning Art Museum
Shenzhen Art Museum
Shenzhen Art Academy.

Bibliography
 Wang Yan Cheng, Lydia Harambourg et Dong Qiang, Cercle d'Art, 2010

References

External links 
  Video documentary on Wang Yancheng on CNTV, Chinese national TV site.

1960 births
20th-century French painters
French male painters
21st-century French painters
Modern painters
Living people
Painters from Guangdong
Commandeurs of the Ordre des Arts et des Lettres